Oscar E. Hailey (December 10, 1870 – July 5, 1958) was an American politician who served as the 16th and 18th lieutenant governor of Idaho, both during the administration of Governor H. C. Baldridge.

Hailey was elected in 1926 along with Baldridge. He was succeeded as the Republican nominee in 1928 by W. B. Kinne, but returned to the position in October 1929 after Kinne died in office.

Hailey also served in the Idaho Legislature. He was a member of the Idaho Senate from 1919 to 1926. He died in 1958 at Weiser, Idaho.

References

Lieutenant Governors of Idaho
Republican Party Idaho state senators
1870 births
1958 deaths